Susan K. Herrera is an American politician serving as a member of the New Mexico House of Representatives for the 41st district, which includes portions of Rio Arriba, Santa Fe County, and Taos counties.

Career 
Prior to entering politics, Hererra worked as a senior associate at Northern Community Development Consulting Associates. She also served as the executive director of the Los Alamos National Laboratory Foundation and director of the Northern New Mexico Community College Foundation.

Herrera was an employee of University of New Mexico Nursing Department. Herrera was elected to the New Mexico House of Representatives in November 2018 and assumed office on January 15, 2019, succeeding incumbent Democrat Debbie Rodella.

Personal life 
Herrera lives in Embudo, New Mexico.

References 

Democratic Party members of the New Mexico House of Representatives
Year of birth missing (living people)
Living people